Aldermanshaw Priory is a former Cluniac Priory, located within the Charnwood Forest, in Leicestershire, England.

History
Aldermanshaw Priory was founded c.1220-1235. It was a cell (a small monastery dependent upon a motherhouse) of Bermondsey Abbey, in London. The name is thought to refer to Alwin (or Alwinus) Child, the founder of the priory's motherhouse at Bermondsey.

The priory was in ruins by 1450.

The priory was in the hamlet of Woodhouse. In the 17th century a cottage, known as Alderman's Haw, was built on the site. The age of some of the stones used to construct the two-story rubble cottage suggests it may incorporate materials from the earlier priory.

References

13th-century establishments in England
Monasteries in Leicestershire